Andrea Green (born 14 December 1968) is an English long-distance runner, specialising in the half-marathon. She ran as part of the British team at the 2000 IAAF World Half Marathon Championships, as well as winning a number of domestic races.

Green was selected to run as part of the British women's team in the 2000 IAAF World Half Marathon Championships along with Paula Radcliffe, Marian Sutton, Sue Reinsford and Sarah Young-Wilkinson. In the build-up to the race she won the Bristol Half Marathon in a personal best time, 1:13:28, a minute ahead of Sue Reinsford who was second. Ultimately in the Mexican heat, only herself, Radcliffe, and Young-Wilkinson competed, with Radcliffe winning the race and the team of three finishing sixth.

Green was selected again in 2002 alongside Amanda Wright-Allen but did not compete.

Competition Record

References

External links 
 
 
 

1968 births
Living people
British female long-distance runners
English female long-distance runners
21st-century British women